William Patrick McHugh (December 21, 1919September 19, 2004) was a professional American football defensive back and halfback in the National Football League. He played five seasons for the Philadelphia Eagles (1947–1951).

External links

1919 births
2004 deaths
Sportspeople from Selma, Alabama
People from Chattanooga, Tennessee
Players of American football from Tennessee
American football running backs
Georgia Tech Yellow Jackets football players
Philadelphia Eagles players